Dryobotodes is a genus of moths of the family Noctuidae.

Species
 Dryobotodes angusta Sugi, 1980
 Dryobotodes banghaasi Draeseke, 1928
 Dryobotodes carbonis (Wagner, 1931)
 Dryobotodes cerriformis Hreblay & Ronkay, 1998
 Dryobotodes chlorota (Hampson, 1909)
 Dryobotodes contermina (Graeser, 1892)
 Dryobotodes eremita – brindled green (Fabricius, 1775)
 Dryobotodes formosanus Hreblay & Ronkay, 1998
 Dryobotodes glaucus L.Ronkay & Gyulai, 2006
 Dryobotodes hampsoni (Hacker & Peks, 1993)
 Dryobotodes himalayensis Hreblay, Peregovits & Ronkay, 1999
 Dryobotodes intermissa (Butler, 1886)
 Dryobotodes lubrica (Butler, 1889)
 Dryobotodes monochroma (Esper, 1790)
 Dryobotodes obliquisigna (Hampson, 1902)
 Dryobotodes praetermissa (Draudt, 1950)
 Dryobotodes pryeri (Leech, 1900)
 Dryobotodes roboris (Boisduval, [1828])
 Dryobotodes servadeii Parenzan, 1981
 Dryobotodes tenebrosa (Esper, 1789)

References
 Dryobotodes at Markku Savela's Lepidoptera and Some Other Life Forms
 Natural History Museum Lepidoptera genus database
 Ronkay, L. & Gyulai, P. (2006). "New Noctuidae (Lepidoptera) species from Iran and Tibet." Esperiana Buchreihe zur Entomologie 12: 211-241.

Cuculliinae